Maria Ahm (born 23 June 1998) is a Danish long-distance runner. In 2019, she competed in the senior women's race at the 2019 IAAF World Cross Country Championships held in Aarhus, Denmark. She finished in 97th place.

References

External links 
 

Living people
1998 births
Place of birth missing (living people)
Danish female long-distance runners
Danish female cross country runners